Ra Ra Riot is the self-titled EP and debut release of the Syracuse-based indie rock band Ra Ra Riot. Recorded in Brooklyn, New York in January 2007, the six-song EP was originally self-released before the band signed with The Rebel Group for distribution.

Track listing
 "Each Year" – 3:48
 "Everest" – 2:26
 "Dying Is Fine" – 6:09
 "Can You Tell" – 2:31
 "A Manner to Act" – 2:51
 "Ghost Under Rocks" – 4:29

Videos
 "Dying Is Fine": Directed by Albert Birney, Nicholas Gurewitch, and Jon Moses.

Personnel
 Milo Bonacci: guitar
 Alexandra Lawn: cello
 Wesley Miles: keyboards / vocals
 John Pike: drums
 Mathieu Santos: bass guitar
 Rebecca Zeller: violin

References

External links
Official website
MySpace website

Ra Ra Riot albums
2007 EPs